Thomas Haigh (1769 – 1808), was an English violinist, pianist, and composer.

Haigh was born in London in 1769, and studied composition under Haydn in 1791 and 1792. Haigh's numerous compositions include sonatas for pianoforte solo and for pianoforte and violin or flute, serenatas, capriccios, and arrangements. Some of them were reprinted at Paris and others at Offenbach.

The better known of them are: Two sets of three sonatas, each for pianoforte, dedicated to Haydn, 1796(?); three sonatas for pianoforte, with accompaniment for violin or flute, London, 1798(?); three sonatas for pianoforte, airs by Giardini introduced, Op. 13, 1800(?); sonata for pianoforte, with air from ‘Beggar's Opera’ introduced, Op. 28, 1800(?); sonata, with air Viva tutte, accompaniment flute or violin, 1812(?); sonata, pianoforte, dedicated to Miss Bain, 1817(?); grand sonata, dedicated to Miss Heathcote, 1819; ‘Yesterday,’ ‘Whan you told us,’ and other ballads, about 1800. A violin concerto and a parody on the 'Lodoiska' for flute (see Clementi's Catalogue) are also ascribed to Haigh in the ‘Dictionary of Music’ of 1827.

From 1793 to 1801 Haigh lived in Manchester, where he probably had family connections. He died in London in April 1808.

References

External links

Musicians from London
1769 births
1808 deaths
18th-century English people
18th-century English musicians
19th-century English musicians
English violinists
19th-century violinists
British male violinists
English composers
18th-century composers
18th-century male musicians
19th-century British composers
Pupils of Joseph Haydn
19th-century British male musicians